Graham Thomas Oakley (27 August 1929 – 19 December 2022) was an English writer and illustrator best known for children's books.

Early life
Oakley was born to Thomas and Flora (Madelay) Oakley in Shrewsbury, Shropshire, England.

Art career
Oakley attended the Warrington Art School in 1950. He worked for London repertory theatre companies as a scenic artist from 1950 to 1955; as a design assistant at the Royal Opera House in Covent Garden, 1955 to 1957; at Crawford's Advertising Agency, 1960 to 1962; at BBC-TV as a set designer for films and series, 1962 to 1967. At BBC he worked on How Green Was My Valley, Nicholas Nickleby, Treasure Island, and Softly, Softly.

Children's books
Oakley is best known for the Church Mice series of picture books (1970 to 2000), next for the Foxbury Force series (1994 to 1998). He also won a Boston Globe–Horn Book Award Special Citation in 1980 for the picture book Graham Oakley's Magical Changes. It features detailed scenes drawn on pages that are cut in half, permitting the user to "turn" the top and bottom halves separately. The combinations are surreal; the original whole-page drawings are already strange. In 2001 it was republished in France, entitled 512 for the number of different combinations possible.

The Church Mice
The Church Mouse - Atheneum, 1972 
The Church Cat Abroad - Atheneum, 1973
The Church Mice and the Moon - Atheneum, 1974
The Church Mice Spread Their Wings - Macmillan (London), 1975
The Church Mice Adrift - Macmillan (London), 1976
The Church Mice at Bay - Macmillan (London), 1978
The Church Mice at Christmas - Atheneum, 1980
The Church Mice in Action - Macmillan (London), 1982
The Diary of a Church Mouse - Macmillan (London), 1986
The Church Mice and the Ring, 1992
Humphrey Hits the Jackpot - Hodder Children's Books, 1998
The Church Mice Take a Break - Hodder Children's Books, 2000

The Church Mice Adrift and The Church Mice in Action were Highly Commended runners-up for the 1976 and 1982 Kate Greenaway Medals from the Library Association, recognising the year's best children's book illustration by a British subject.

The Foxbury Force
The Foxbury Force - Macmillan, 1995
Foxbury Force And The Pirates - Macmillan, 1996
The Foxbury Force & The Ghost - Macmillan, 1998

Later life and death
According to the 2008 Modern Classics edition of The Church Mice, he lived in Lyme Regis, Dorset and was "mostly retired".

Oakley died in Dorset on 19 December 2022, at the age of 93.

See also
 Movable books

Notes

References

External links

 
 Who is Graham Oakley? and Bibliography by librarian Kathleen Watson (alia.org.au/~kwatson), archived 2012-02-04
Interview with the Church Mice
 Graham Oakley: The Man Who Created The Church Mice (Part 1) and (Part 2) – 2011 interview at The Polymath Perspective
 
  

 

1929 births
2022 deaths
Artists from Shrewsbury
British children's book illustrators
English children's writers
English illustrators
Writers from Shrewsbury